St. Francis's Church, Kraków can refer to:
 St. Francis of Assisi's Church, Kraków
 St. Francis de Sales' Church, Kraków